Guitar Blues is an album by singer and songwriter Leon Russell. The album was released on August 21, 2001 by Leon Russell Records. The album was by produced and all songs were written and performed by Russell.  Guitar Blues was recorded in 1995. Leon show cases this guitar skills. Russell plays all the instruments, excluding the drums, that are played by his son, Teddy Jack.

More C. Michael Bailey with  "All About  Jazz" reviewed the album:
"It displays the guitar side of Mr. Russell and the listener will immediately identify his guitar playing (It has changed little since Dogs and Englishmen."

Track listing
 "Ways of a Woman" 	4:37 	 	
 "House of Blues"	02:42 	 	
 "Rip Van Winkle"	2:46 	 	
 	"This Love I Have for You"	3:14 	 	
 	"Lost Inside the Blues"	4:27 	 	
 	"Dark Carousel"	4:21 	 	
 	"It's Impossible"	2:41 	 	
 	"My Hard Times"	4:29 	 	
 	"Strange Power of Love"	3:26 	 	
 	"Make Everything Alright"	3:36 	 	
 	"The Same Old Song"	3:55 	 	
 	"End of the Road" 	02:29

Personnel
Leon Russell – guitar 
Teddy Jack – drums
Buster Phillips – drums

References

External links
Leon Russell discography
Leon Russell lyrics
Leon Russell NAMM Oral History Program Interview (2012)

2001 albums
Leon Russell albums
Albums produced by Leon Russell